Augustine Joe Arapyona Salimo (died 2019)   was an Anglican bishop in Uganda: he was the inaugural Bishop of Sebei, serving from 1999 to 2015.

References

21st-century Anglican bishops in Uganda
20th-century Anglican bishops in Uganda
Uganda Christian University alumni
Anglican bishops of Sebei
2019 deaths